Tsavo may refer to:

Tsavo River, in Kenya
Tsavo, a region of Kenya
Tsavo East National Park
Tsavo West National Park
Tsavo Man-Eaters, a pair of lions in 1898
 The Man-eaters of Tsavo, book by John Henry Patterson
Tsavo sunbird (Cinnyris tsavoensis), a small bird of Kenya and Tanzania